Mark Reed (born 23 March 1971) is a British sculptor based in East Anglia. He works primarily in metal – bronze, forged steel and aluminium, his themes include nature, family and the passage of time.

Biography 
Born in Colchester, he spent his early years in Suffolk, relocating with his family to a Fruit Farm in rural Norfolk in his teens. The trees in the orchards he once pruned and shaped have inspired much of Reed's sculpture and furniture. 
Mark studied Engineering at the University of Wales. 

Reed launched his nature inspired range of furniture in 1999 at Decorex, London and it was at this time that Derek Pullen, Head of Sculpture Conservation, Tate Collections described Reed's Leaf Chair in cast aluminium as "a very well resolved and elegant design." In 2002 Mark made Penshurst Dining Table for Fortnum & Mason, London. During this period he worked mainly within the sphere of furniture and interior design, but then turned his attention to sculpture, setting up a foundry in his studio and thus began casting his own bronzes. His initial sculptures explored his fascination with nature and he quickly became known for his tree sculptures in forged steel, the individual branches are heated in the forge and then tapered on the anvil, so the fluid shape of the tree begins to 'grow'. On the birth of his first son in 2004 Reed's own experiences of family life led to a new direction in his work, with his fork and spoon sculptures in stainless steel. In 2004 he worked on his first public commission- Bronze and Cast Iron Tree Planters for The Prince's Trust and the City of London, unveiled by the Lord Mayor of the City.

In 2005, Reed lost his daughter to cot death and his struggle to deal with her loss created Salvation, which is both a teardrop, where tears are the overflow for raging internal emotions and a droplet of rain or dew which is vital for the existence of life. All profits from the sale of this sculpture have gone to The Foundation for the Study of Infant Death Mark regularly uses recycled materials where possible and was actively involved in the Creative Partnership Initiative, working with local primary schools to engage and discuss in the creative process that evolved into his Spaceship (2011) sculpture and Spoon Seesaw 2012. He currently lives with his wife and four boys near Swaffham in Norfolk.

Sculpture 

Reed's sculptures have nature and his place within it at its roots, with his education in engineering and biology, he is interested in the workings of natural structures and the way they contribute to the artistic view of a plant or animal. With this knowledge, within Mark's work, trees become tables, and natural forms are channelled to become functional items in bronze, aluminium or forged steel. Mark is intrigued by intangible configurations as well, particularly in how an entity exists as an component in a hierarchy of cooperatives. In his bronze Life Leaf(2000) a solitary leaf is the "life giver", it gives energy to the entire tree, whilst being recycled into the organism. The rooks in Secret Garden Door are a group descending on the tree with giant spring nests, and therefore indicating the death of winter and new life for a tree. Meanwhile, there is a looking forward momentum in Reed's work, the door opens into the future or the viewers' imagination, the eroded holes within the leaf allow shards of life to permeate through.

Reed's 4.5m x 3.5m forged and stainless steel Arbour Metallum  tree sculpture, (inspired by the windswept trees in his native North Norfolk Coast), was unveiled at Chelsea Flower Show and was exhibited at the Royal Horticultural Society gardens at Wisley in 2013. He sees it as "a protector, from the heat of the sun, creating a dappled shade, as nature protects and nourishes us." Reed's family and children influence his other work -whilst Mark was feeding his baby, the unassuming spoon suddenly became massively significant, as a means of giving sustenance and independence. The same tool can be alienating as well as vital, as in an infant's hands, an adult spoon is huge and out of place. So the stainless steel Spoon Bench (2004) was conceived, at odds with its place and size, and as if levitating. In August 2013, Reed made a Spoon Sculpture to public commission for a hospital in Welwyn, Herts and in July 2013, he was commissioned to make A Bridge to Success for the Prince of Wales and The Prince's Trust at Sandringham Flower Show. Mark has produced many commissions and his work can be found in collections in four continents.

In 2010, Reed created Ammonite Slice, inspired by a visit to the Natural History Museum in London and the juxtaposition of nature and the mathematical fractal spiral inside an ammonite shell. He is fascinated by the contrasts of the alien and familiar & the alliance of science and nature.

References

External links
Mark Reed's website: www.markreedsculpture.com

1971 births
Living people
English sculptors
English male sculptors
20th-century British sculptors
21st-century British sculptors
21st-century male artists
People from Colchester
People from Swaffham
British contemporary artists